The Scottish Greyhound Derby was an original classic greyhound competition held at Shawfield Stadium.

Held at Carntyne Stadium from 1928 to 1968, after the closure of Carntyne the race appeared at Shawfield from 1970 until 1985.

In 1988 the Greyhound Racing Association (GRA), moved the race to Powderhall Stadium in Edinburgh because they had the rights to the event and wanted it to take place at one of their tracks. After just two years it returned to Glasgow and Shawfield following the sale of Powderhall by the GRA.

Past winners

Venues & Distances
1928–1968 (Carntyne 525 y)
1969 (Cancelled)
1970–1974 (Shawfield 525 y)
1975 (Shawfield 485 m) 
1976 (Shawfield 505 m)
1977 (Shawfield 480 m)
1978–1985 (Shawfield 500 m) 
1987–1988 (Powderhall 465 m)
1989–1994 (Shawfield 500 m)
1995–2019 (Shawfield 480 m)

Sponsors
1982-1983 (Harp Lager)
1989-1990 (Ladbrokes)
1991-2003 (Regal)
2004-2005 (Totesport)
2006-2006 (BGRB)
2007-2007 (John R Weir Mercedes Benz)
2008-2009 (ibetX.com)
2010-2012 (Bettor.com)
2013-2014 (Ladbrokes)
2015-2019 (Racing Post Greyhound TV)

References

Greyhound racing competitions in the United Kingdom
Greyhound racing in Scotland
Recurring sporting events established in 1928
Sports competitions in Glasgow